Dell Loy Hansen (born ) is an American businessman and sports team owner. He is the founder and CEO of Wasatch Group, a real estate investment firm, and was the owner of Real Salt Lake of Major League Soccer.

Career

Hansen was born in Salina, Utah, and raised in southern Utah by his father, working for the Soil Conservation Service, and his mother, a schoolteacher. He graduated from the Jon M. Huntsman School of Business at Utah State University in 1982 with a Bachelor of Science in political science.

Hansen started a home-building business that closed during a savings and loan crisis in 1988. Hansen founded the Wasatch Group later that year, taking over government-seized real estate from the Resolution Trust Corporation for resale. The company later expanded into commercial office development and management, including the ownership of high-rise buildings in the Salt Lake City area. , the Wasatch Group manages 65 properties in the Western United States, worth an estimated $1.3 billion, and employs 500 people. Hansen also owns Broadway Media, which manages several radio stations in Utah.

Sports ownership

Hansen bought a minority stake in the ownership of Major League Soccer franchise Real Salt Lake in 2009 from Dave Checketts. His involvement with the club began with a political fundraiser at Rio Tinto Stadium during a U.S. men's national team match, his second time watching live soccer, where Checketts had pitched the stake to former Disney CEO Michael Eisner before Hansen negotiated his share. Hansen's stake, originally 49 percent of the club, was increased to 62 percent in late 2012. Checketts sold his majority stake in the team to Hansen in 2013, giving him full control of the club, Rio Tinto Stadium, and sports radio station KALL.

Under Hansen's ownership through Utah Soccer LLC, Real Salt Lake launched a reserve team, Real Monarchs, that began play in 2015. The team was moved to a new venue, Zions Bank Stadium, on the grounds of a soccer academy in Herriman, Utah, that was partially funded by Hansen and opened in 2018. Hansen also negotiated a tax break with the Sandy city government for Rio Tinto Stadium, which was protested by city leaders in 2017. RSL also launched a women's team, Utah Royals FC of the National Women's Soccer League, that began play in 2018. Hansen had approached Merritt Paulson of the Portland Timbers and Portland Thorns about a franchise in the women's league four years earlier and bought the rights to defunct franchise FC Kansas City.

Controversy and end of ownership

Following a player strike that caused the postponement of MLS matches on August 27, 2020, Hansen expressed his disappointment in an interview with radio station KXRK, also threatening to cease funding the club due to players not playing to show support for Black Lives Matter and to protest the shooting of Jacob Blake. The comments were criticized by prominent MLS and NBA players, which caused him to later retract his comments in an interview with ESPN700 and issue an apology. An article published later that day in The Athletic reported a history of alleged racist comments made by Hansen about or in the presence of Black employees at the Wasatch Group and in the RSL organization. Further allegations were also published in The Salt Lake Tribune, including Hansen's mimicking of Black employee's accents, triggering investigations from MLS and NWSL. On August 30, 2020, MLS and NWSL announced that Hansen would explore selling Real Salt Lake, Real Monarchs, and the Utah Royals. In December 2020, Utah Soccer LLC announced that the Royals would move to Kansas City while a new franchise in Utah would be re-established in 2023.

Personal life

Hansen and his first wife Karla Axtell had eight children. His daughter Robin played college soccer for the Utah State Aggies in 2012. He was later married in 1997 to Lynnette Hansen, a business executive and philanthropist. Hansen is currently married to Julie Aiken Hansen. Hansen is also an avid coin collector and acquired a rare 1894-S Barber dime for $1.3 million in 2019.

References

Living people
People from Sevier County, Utah
Real Salt Lake
Real Monarchs
Utah Royals FC
Businesspeople from Utah
American soccer chairmen and investors
Major League Soccer owners
Utah State University alumni
Year of birth missing (living people)